Moon is a 2009 science fiction drama film directed by Duncan Jones (in his directorial debut) and written by Nathan Parker from a story by Jones. The film follows Sam Bell (Sam Rockwell), a man who experiences a personal crisis as he nears the end of a three-year solitary stint mining helium-3 on the far side of the Moon. Dominique McElligott, Kaya Scodelario, Benedict Wong, Matt Berry, and Malcolm Stewart also star. Moon premiered at the 2009 Sundance Film Festival and was released in selected cinemas in New York and Los Angeles on 12 June 2009. The release was expanded to additional theatres in the United States on 10 July and to the United Kingdom on 17 July. A follow-up film containing an epilogue to the film's events, Mute, was released in 2018. A third installment, a graphic novel called Madi: Once Upon A Time in the Future, was released in 2020.

Moon was modestly budgeted and grossed just under $10 million worldwide, but was well-received by critics. Rockwell's performance found praise. The movie won numerous film critic and film festival awards and was nominated for the BAFTA Award for Best British Film, and won the Hugo Award for Best Dramatic Presentation in 2010.

Plot
In the near future, Lunar Industries has made a fortune after an oil crisis by building Sarang Station, a facility on the far side of the Moon to mine the alternative fuel helium-3 from lunar soil, which is rich in the material. The facility is highly automated, requiring only a single human to maintain operations, oversee harvester machines, and launch canisters bound for Earth containing the extracted helium-3. Samuel Bell nears the end of his three-year work contract at Sarang Station. Chronic communication problems have disabled his live feed from Earth and limit him to occasional recorded messages from his wife Tess, who was pregnant with their daughter Eve when he left. His only companion is an artificial intelligence named GERTY, who assists with the base's automation and provides comfort for him.

Two weeks before his return to Earth, Sam begins to suffer from hallucinations of a teenage girl and a bearded, disheveled man. One such image distracts him while he is out recovering a helium-3 canister from a harvester, causing him to crash his lunar rover into the harvester. Rapidly losing cabin air from the crash, Sam falls unconscious.

Sam awakes in the base infirmary with no memory of the accident. He overhears GERTY having what appears to be a live chat with Lunar Industries management. Lunar Industries then orders Sam to remain on base and informs him that a rescue team will arrive to repair the harvester. Suspicious, Sam manufactures a fake problem to persuade GERTY to let him outside. He travels to the crashed rover, where he finds his unconscious doppelganger. He brings the double back to the base and tends to his injuries. The two Sams start to wonder if one is a clone of the other. After a heated argument and physical altercation, GERTY reveals that they are both clones of the original Sam Bell. GERTY activated the newest clone after the rover crash and convinced him that he was at the beginning of his three-year contract. GERTY confirms his memories of his wife and daughter are implanted.

The two Sams search the area, finding a communications substation beyond the facility's perimeter which has been interfering with the live feed from Earth. GERTY helps the older Sam access the recorded logs of past Sam clones, showing them all falling ill as their contract expires. Later, the older Sam discovers a secret vault containing hundreds of hibernating clones. They determine that Lunar Industries is unethically using clones of the original Sam Bell to avoid the cost of training and transporting new astronauts, as well as deliberately jamming the live feed in order to prevent the clones from contacting Earth; clones who believe they are entering the final hibernation at the end of their contract just before their final return to Earth are in fact incinerated. The older Sam clone drives past the interference radius in a second rover and tries to call Tess on Earth. He instead makes contact with Eve, now 15 years old, who says Tess died "some years ago". He hangs up when Eve tells her father (offscreen, identified as "Original Sam" in closed captioning) that someone is calling regarding Tess. After he returns, the older Sam begins displaying the same symptoms as previous clones as they begin to deteriorate.

The two Sams realize that the incoming rescue team will kill them both if they are found together. The newer Sam convinces GERTY to wake another clone, planning to leave the awakened clone in the crashed rover and send the older Sam to Earth in one of the helium-3 transports. But the older Sam, having learned that the clones are designed to break down at the end of the 3-year contract, knows that he will not live much longer. With his health rapidly declining, the older Sam suggests that he be placed back into the crashed rover to die so that Lunar Industries will not suspect anything, while the newer Sam escapes instead.

Following GERTY's advice, the newer Sam reboots GERTY to wipe its records of the events. Before leaving, the newer clone reprograms a harvester to crash and wreck the jamming antenna, thereby enabling live communications with Earth; he also brings along a canister of helium-3 to provide him with funds once he reaches Earth. The older Sam, back in the crippled rover, remains conscious long enough to watch the launch of the transport carrying the newer Sam to Earth. The rescue team is successfully fooled after finding both a newly-awakened clone in the medical bay and the corpse of the older Sam inside of the crashed rover.

The helium transport arrives at Earth, and over the film's credits, news reports describe how Sam's testimony on Lunar Industries' activities has stirred up an enormous controversy, and the company's unethical practices have caused their stock to plummet.

Cast

Additionally, Robin Chalk appears as Rockwell's body double in portraying the Sam Bell clones.

Production
This is the first feature film directorial debut for Duncan Jones, who co-wrote the script with Nathan Parker. The film was specifically written as a vehicle for actor Sam Rockwell. Rockwell almost turned the film down and Paddy Considine was an alternate choice. The film pays homage to the films of Jones' youth, such as Silent Running (1972), Alien (1979), and Outland (1981). In an interview with Wired.com, speaking about those films, Jones stated it was his "intent to write for a science fiction-literate audience" and that he "wanted to make a film which would be appreciated by people like myself who loved those films". Conceptual design was from Gavin Rothery.

Jones described his interest in the lunar setting:

The director described the lack of romance in the Moon as a location, citing images from the Japanese lunar orbiter SELENE: "It's the desolation and emptiness of it ... it looks like some strange ball of clay in blackness. ... Look at photos and you'll think that they're monochrome. In fact, they're not. There simply are no primary colours." Jones made reference to the photography book Full Moon by Michael Light in designing the look of the film.

Moons budget was US$5 million. The director took steps to minimise production costs, such as keeping the cast small and filming in a studio. Moon was produced at Shepperton Studios, in London, where it was filmed in 33 days. Jones preferred using models to digital animation, working with Bill Pearson, the supervising model maker on Alien, to help design the lunar rovers and helium-3 harvesters in the film. The Moon base's artificial intelligence, GERTY, was designed to be bound to an overhead rail within the mining base since its mechanical tether was critical to the story's plot. Spacey's vocal portrayal of GERTY was heavily influenced by HAL in 2001: A Space Odyssey (1968), voiced by Douglas Rain. The visual effects were provided by Cinesite, which has sought cut-price deals with independent films. Since Jones had an effects background with TV advertisements, he drew on his experience to create special effects within a small budget.

To save further on production costs, Jones re-used several set pieces from an abandoned movie based on the BBC TV sci-fi comedy Red Dwarf. These include the sleeping quarters and the corridor of the "secret room".

Release

International sales for Moon are handled by the Independent sales company. Sony Pictures Worldwide Acquisitions Group acquired distribution rights to the film for English-speaking territories. Sony Pictures Worldwide Acquisitions Group was considering making Moon a direct-to-DVD release; however, after Moon premiered at the 2009 Sundance Film Festival in January 2009, Sony Pictures Classics decided to handle this film's theatrical release for Sony Pictures Worldwide Acquisitions Group.

Sony Pictures Classics distributed the film in the United States in cinemas, beginning with screenings in selected cinemas in New York and Los Angeles on 12 June. The film's British premiere was held on 20 June 2009 at the Cameo Cinema in Edinburgh as part of the 63rd Edinburgh International Film Festival. Jones was present at the screening along with other key crew members. The full UK release was on 17 July. The Australian release was on 8 October.

A high-resolution, 4k remastered version of the film was released on 16 July 2019 for the tenth anniversary of the film.

Box office
Moon grossed £700,396 from its domestic UK release, $3.4 million from its North American release and $9.8 million worldwide.

Critical reception
Moon was generally well-received by critics.  

Damon Wise of The Times praised Jones' "thoughtful" direction and Rockwell's "poignant" performance. Wise wrote of the film's approach to the science fiction genre: "Though it uses impressive sci-fi trappings to tell its story—the fabulous models and moonscapes are recognisably retro yet surprisingly real—this is a film about what it means, and takes, to be human." Duane Byrge of The Hollywood Reporter applauded screenwriter Nathan Parker's "sharp [and] individualistic" dialogue and the way in which Parker combined science fiction and Big Brother themes. Byrge also believed that cinematographer Gary Shaw's work and composer Clint Mansell's music intensified the drama. Byrge wrote: "Nonetheless, 'Moon' is darkened by its own excellencies: The white, claustrophobic look is apt and moody, but a lack of physical action enervates the story thrust." The critic felt mixed about the star's performance, describing him as "adept at limning his character's dissolution" but finding that he did not have "the audacious, dominant edge" for the major confrontation at the end of the film. Roger Ebert, giving the film three and a half stars out of four, wrote:

Empire magazine praised Rockwell's performance, including it in '10 Egregious Oscar Snubs—The worthy contenders that the Academy overlooked' feature and referred to his performance as "one ... of the best performances of the year". Rolling Stone magazine ranked the film at number 23 on their Top 40 Sci-Fi Movies of the 21st Century, finding that "Duncan Jones' debut feature keeps you wondering whether its hero - played by an on-point Sam Rockwell - is losing a battle with what appears to be his "double" or if he, is, in fact, losing his mind ... this sci-fi indie does a helluva lot with very, very little". Digital Spy said it was an "incredible low-budget science fiction movie", opining that Jones' direction of the film "brilliantly explores ideas of identity while mixing in some practical VFX spectacle to boot. This is perhaps one of the best sci-fi films of the 21st century".

A. O. Scott, chief film critic for The New York Times wrote that Jones directing "demonstrates impressive technical command, infusing a sparse narrative and a small, enclosed space with a surprising density of moods and ideas". Scott said that like most of science fiction, the film "is a meditation on the conflict between the streamlining tendencies of technological progress and the stubborn persistence of feelings and desires that can't be tamed by utilitarian imperatives", while also asserting that "the film's ideas are interesting, but don't feel entirely worked out..the smallness of this movie is decidedly a virtue, but also, in the end, something of a limitation". Moon also received positive reviews at the Sundance Film Festival.

Reception from the scientific community
Moon was screened as part of a lecture series at NASA's Space Center Houston, at the request of a professor there. "He'd been reading online that we'd done this film about helium-3 mining and that's something that people at NASA are working on", says Jones. "We did a Q&A afterward. They asked me why the base looked so sturdy, like a bunker, and not like the kind of stuff they are designing that they are going to transport with them. I said 'Well, in the future I assume you won't want to continue carrying everything with you, you'll want to use the resources on the moon to build things' and a woman in the audience raised her hand and said, 'I'm actually working on something called mooncrete, which is concrete that mixes lunar regolith and ice water from the Moon's polar caps.

In the 2013 October issue of the journal Trends in Cognitive Sciences, academics ranked their top brain science movies of all time; their database being compiled by cognitive science researchers who are also movie buffs. The database, called the Cognitive Science Movie Index, ranks films for quality, relevance and accuracy in the field of cognitive science. On their top 10 lists of brain science movies of all time, Moon appears at number 5 on the quality list, number 9 on the accuracy list and number 3 on the relevance list.

Accolades

Sequels
Jones released a follow-up film, titled Mute, which serves as a spiritual successor to Moon. It was released on 23 February 2018, as a Netflix exclusive. In the film, on a TV broadcast of a court trial, Sam Bell and several of his clones are all seen in the courtroom, identifying themselves in an "I'm Spartacus" allusion. A third installment, Madi: Once Upon A Time in the Future, was released as a graphic novel in 2020.

See also
Teletransportation paradox
Colonization of the Moon
Survival film

Notes

References

External links
 
 
 
 
 
 

2009 films
2009 independent films
2000s science fiction adventure films
British independent films
British science fiction adventure films
American independent films
American science fiction adventure films
American space adventure films
2000s English-language films
Films about astronauts
Films about cloning
Exploration of the Moon
Films set in the future
Films set in 2035
Hugo Award for Best Dramatic Presentation, Long Form winning works
Sony Pictures Classics films
Stage 6 Films films
Films about artificial intelligence
Films directed by Duncan Jones
Films produced by Trudie Styler
Films scored by Clint Mansell
Films shot at Shepperton Studios
Two-handers
2000s survival films
Moon in film
2009 directorial debut films
Hard science fiction films
2000s American films
2000s British films